Henrietta Green (born 27 October 1948) is a British food writer and advocate of the local food movement.

Green was born in St John's Wood where she grew up.

Her first directory, British Food Finds published in 1987 listed many of these and she now runs www.FoodLoversBritain.com which acts as an up-to-date online directory.

In 1998 she organised a Food Lovers' Fair at Borough Market, which recruited several new long-term traders and helped revive the market.

In March – April 2009, she featured as a judge on ITV's Taste The Nation in which regional teams from across the UK competed to be crowned winner.

She regularly appears on BBC Radio 4's The Food Programme, and writes regularly in Food Magazines

Works
Fine Flavoured Food: Fresh Approach to Lighter Cookery, 1978
The Marinade Cookbook, 1979
British Food Finds, 1987
RAC Food Routes: The Motorists' Guide to Seeing, Tasting and Buying Britain’s Best Local Food, 1988
10 Minute Cuisine: Good Fresh Food Very Fast, 1990(?)
(with Marie-Pierre Moine)
Quick Cuisine – Sensation Food in Less Than 30 Minutes, 1991
(with Marie-Pierre Moine and Lewis Esson)
Fast Food for Friends, 1996
(with Lewis Esson, Marie-Pierre Moine and Patrice de Villiers)
Henrietta Green’s New Country Kitchen: The Best Produce, the Best Recipes, 1992 published in America as A Glorious Harvest: Robust Recipes from the Dairy, Pasture, Orchard and Sea, 1994
Henrietta Green’s Food Lovers' Guide to Britain, 1993
Fresh from the Garden: The RHS Cookbook, 1994
The Festive Food of England, 1995
Henrietta Green’s Food Lovers' Christmas, 1997
Recipes from an English Country Garden (Sarah’s Garden), 1998
Henrietta Green’s Farmers' Market Cookbook, 2001
The Borough Market Book: From Roots to Renaissance, 2006

References

External links
Taste The Nation

English food writers
Living people
1948 births